The Young Pope is a drama television series created and directed by Paolo Sorrentino for Sky Atlantic, HBO, and Canal+. The series stars Jude Law as the disruptive Pope Pius XIII and Diane Keaton as his confidante, Sister Mary, in a Vatican full of intrigues. The series was co-produced by the European production companies Wildside, Haut et Court TV, and Mediapro.

The world premiere of The Young Pope was on 3 September 2016 at the 73rd Venice International Film Festival, where the first two episodes were screened out of competition, the first time in the history of the festival that a TV series has been a part of the program. The series premiered on television on 21 October 2016 on Sky Atlantic in Italy.

The Young Pope was originally designed as a limited series, and was marketed as such especially in the United States. However, it was later followed by The New Pope, with Law returning and joined by John Malkovich. Production began in Italy in late 2018.

On 14 July 2017, The Young Pope received two nominations for the 69th Primetime Creative Arts Emmy Awards, becoming the first Italian TV series to be nominated for a Primetime Emmy Award.

Plot
A young cardinal, Lenny Belardo, becomes pope of the Catholic Church when machinations of the leading contenders to gain the position themselves fail. He takes the name of Pius XIII and proceeds to challenge the established traditions and practices of the Vatican. He installs Sister Mary, the nun who raised him in an orphanage, to serve as his chief adviser. Driven by his desire to confront his parents, who abandoned him as a boy, Belardo takes the church in a new conservative direction, causing disruption inside and outside the Vatican.

Cast

Main
 Jude Law as Pope Pius XIII (born Lenny Belardo), the newly elected Pope and former Archbishop of New York
 Diane Keaton as Sister Mary, an American religious sister, who raised Belardo and Dussolier in an orphanage, has helped him throughout his career and is appointed personal secretary to the Pope
 Silvio Orlando as Cardinal Angelo Voiello, Camerlengo and Cardinal Secretary of State
 Javier Cámara as Monsignor (later Cardinal) Bernardo Gutierrez, Master of Ceremonies of the Holy See
 Scott Shepherd as Cardinal Andrew Dussolier, a missionary, Belardo's longtime friend and a fellow orphan
 Cécile de France as Sofia Dubois, in charge of marketing for the Holy See
 Ludivine Sagnier as Esther, the wife of a member of the Pontifical Swiss Guard
 Toni Bertorelli as Cardinal Caltanissetta, an elderly and powerful master of Vatican politics with inscrutable motives
 James Cromwell as Cardinal Michael Spencer, former archbishop of New York and Belardo's mentor
 Stefano Accorsi as the Prime Minister of Italy

Recurring
  as Father Federico Amatucci, Cardinal Voiello's confidant
  as Father Valente, one of the Pope's assistants
 Sebastian Roché as Cardinal Michel Marivaux, Prefect of the Congregation for the Causes of the Saints
 Marcello Romolo as Don Tommaso Viglietti (later created a Cardinal), the Pope's and the cardinals' confessor
 Vladimir Bibic as Cardinal Ozolins
  as Cardinal Aguirre
 Nadee Kammellaweera as Sister Suree, a secretarial worker at the Vatican
  as Cardinal Mario Assente
 Daniel Vivian as Domen, the Pope's butler
 Biagio Forestieri as Peter, a member of the Pontifical Swiss Guard and Esther's husband
 Giancarlo Fares as Franco, Girolamo's caregiver
 Edoardo Bussi as Girolamo, Voiello's best friend who has a severe disability
 Carolina Carlsson as the Prime Minister of Greenland
  as the Virgin Mary
 Franco Pinelli as Tonino Pettola, a charlatan who claims that he can see the Virgin Mother among his sheep flock
 Madalina Bellariu as Elena, an escort
 Tony Plana as Carlos García, a Honduran drug dealer and Maribeth's husband
 Monica Cetti as Contessa Meraviglia, a hedonistic Italian noblewoman
 Rayna Tharani as Maribeth, Cardinal Dussolier's married girlfriend
 Alessia Giulia Trujillo Alva as Blessed Juana
 Andre Gregory as Elmore Coen, a writer
 Guy Boyd as Archbishop Kurtwell, a suspected child molester
 Kevin Jackson as Pete Washington, a potential witness of Kurtwell's crimes
 Jan Hoag as Rose, the manager of a hotel in New York City
 Alex Esola as Freddy Blakestone, an aspiring tennis player that was involved in the Kurtwell case

Flashbacks
 Allison Case as young Sister Mary
 Frank Gingerich as young Lenny Belardo
 Olivia Macklin as Lenny Belardo's mother
 Jack McQuaid as young Andrew Dussolier
 Collin Smith as Lenny Belardo's father
 Ann Darlington Carr as the Custodian's wife, miraculously cured by Balardo's prayer
 Brian Keane as the Custodian

Guests
 Massimiliano Gallo as Captain Becchi, a Carabinieri officer
 Emilio Dino Conti as the Italian Prime Minister's advisor
 Marcos Franz as Ángelo Sanchez, a young man whose application to become a priest has been rejected
 Milvia Marigliano as Sister Antonia, a missionary nun serving in Africa
 Nicolas Coster as an American journalist
 Todd Grinnell as Archbishop Kurtwell's assistant
 Troy Ruptash as David Tanistone, Archbishop Kurtwell's secret son

Episodes

Production 
The Young Pope, the first TV series by Paolo Sorrentino, was produced by Lorenzo Mieli and Mario Gianani, together with the French company Haut et Court TV and the Spanish company Mediapro. The project was financed by Sky, Canal+ and HBO, which contributed 40 million euros, with part of the money coming from the European Regional Development Fund. Production took three years between 2014 and 2016.

The script was written by Sorrentino, Stefano Rulli, Tony Grisoni and Umberto Contarello. The cast, announced between July and August 2015, includes Jude Law as the young pope; Diane Keaton as Sister Mary; James Cromwell, Silvio Orlando, Scott Shepherd, Javier Cámara and Toni Bertorelli. It also includes Cécile de France, Ludivine Sagnier, Guy Boyd, Andre Gregory, Sebastian Roché, Marcello Romolo, Ignazio Oliva, Vladimir Bibic, Daniel Vivian and Nadie Kammalaweera. The main character is almost always seen only from the waist up, to give the impression that he might be soaring. Sorrentino said he inherited this technique from Spike Lee.

Principal photography, which took seven months, started in August 2015 and took place mainly in the Cinecittà studios, where the interior of the Vatican was recreated. Exterior shots and garden scenes were taken at a number of villas, primarily Villa Lante (Bagnaia), Villa Medici, and Orto Botanico dell'Università di Roma "La Sapienza", while some interior shots were also taken inside Palazzo Venezia. Parts of the last episode were shot in piazza San Marco in Venice.

Broadcast
The series premiered on 21 October 2016 on Sky Atlantic in Italy and Sky Atlantic in Germany and Austria, on 27 October 2016 on Sky Atlantic in the United Kingdom and Ireland, on 28 October 2016 on HBO Europe in various European countries, and on 15 January 2017 on HBO and HBO Canada in the United States and Canada. It premiered in Australia on SBS Television on 29 April 2017. In India it was telecast on ZeeCafe.

Reception
The Young Pope received positive reviews in the UK, Ireland, and Italy. Jude Law's performance has garnered praise by Jasper Rees of The Daily Telegraph, while the Italian weekly Catholic magazine Famiglia Cristiana objected to "caricature-like characters created to appeal to an American audience".

On US review aggregator Metacritic, it has a rating of 68, indicating "generally favorable reviews". The show also currently has a 79% positive rating from review aggregator Rotten Tomatoes combining 76 reviews. Its "Critics Consensus": "The Young Popes original premise and stylish blend of over-the-top melodrama with profane comedy helps overcome an occasionally muddled plot."

Some Catholic reviewers were put off by what they perceived as the series' anti-Catholic stance. Such critics took issue with a presentation of the Church they found to be caricatural and "cartoonish". Other reviewers complained about anti-Catholicism in the entertainment industry more broadly. However, some conservative reviewers praised the show for its portrayal of tradition and authentic religious devotion.

Audience viewership
In Italy, the two-hour premiere drew the highest rating ever for the pay TV network Sky. With 953,000 viewers overnight, it beat the initial release of Gomorrah and the Italian release of Game of Thrones.

Awards and nominations

Home media release

Notes

References

External links

 
 
 

2010s Italian television miniseries
2016 Italian television series debuts
2016 Italian television series endings
Canal+ original programming
English-language television shows
Films about fictional popes
HBO original programming
Sky Atlantic (Italy) television programmes
Television series about Christian religious leaders
Television shows filmed in Italy
Television shows set in Vatican City
Catholic Church in popular culture